Richard Braytoft was the member of Parliament for Coventry in 1460-61 and 1467–68. He was also mayor four times. He was a merchant.

References 

Members of the Parliament of England for Coventry
English MPs 1460
English MPs 1467
Year of birth missing
Year of death missing
Mayors of Coventry
English merchants